National Secondary Route 235, or just Route 235 (or ) is a National Road Route of Costa Rica, located in the Puntarenas province.

Description
In Puntarenas province the route covers Quepos canton (Quepos district).

References

Highways in Costa Rica